Courtney M. Williams (born May 11, 1994) is an American professional basketball player for the Chicago Sky of the Women's National Basketball Association (WNBA). Williams completed her high school basketball career at Charlton County High School. She signed with the University of South Florida and enrolled at the school in the fall of 2012.

High school career 
She played basketball for the Indians at Charlton County High School. Her mother Michelle Williams (then Michelle Granger) also played basketball for the same high school 22 years earlier. Michelle set the single-game scoring record when she scored 40 points. In her junior season, Williams took over the record by scoring 42 points in a game.

Collegiate career

Freshman
Williams was a solid role player coming off the bench in her first season with the South Florida Bulls. she appeared in every game and started in 3. She averaged 7.4 points, 3.4 rebounds and .88 assists over 33 games.

Sophomore
In Williams sophomore year she averaged 30.4 minutes a game compared to her 15.3 coming off the bench the season before. She finished the year with 16.3 points a game along with 7.5 rebounds and 2.4 assists. She was named All-Conference First team and was an Honorable Mention for the All-American team.

Junior 
She was a starter in every game and averaged 20.3 points per game which led the AAC. Overall she was the ninth leading scorer in the country with 20 or more points in 20 different games. During one stretch of 10 game she scored over 20 points in each game which is the longest streak in the nation at the time.

Senior 
In her senior year Williams hit 308 field goals which was second in the nation among all Division I teams.  She scored 763 points which was eighth best among all Division I players.

Williams was inducted into the University of South Florida Athletic Hall of Fame in 2019 and her number 10 jersey is retired by the team.

South  Florida statistics

Source

USA Basketball 

Williams was selected as one of 12 players to play for the US at the 2015 World University games, held in Gwangju, South Korea in July 2015. The USA team opened with a win over Italy. In the second game against China, Williams was the leading scorer with 18 points. The USA team won the next two points to earn a berth in the semifinal against Japan. The USA team was down by 15 points, but came back to tie the game up and send the game into overtime. The teams matched scores in the first overtime and went into double overtime for the first time in World University Games history. With 10 seconds left in the second overtime, Japan cut the lead to two points but Williams hit two free throws to secure the victory. Williams recorded a double double, scoring 17 points and securing 10 rebounds. The gold-medal game was against Canada. The USA won the gold-medal 82–63 with Williams again contributing a double double, with 15 points and 10 rebounds.

Professional career 
Williams was selected as the eighth overall pick by the Phoenix Mercury in the 2016 WNBA draft. She was surprised by the selection since she didn't have many pre draft discussions with the Mercury. Williams has identified Diana Taurasi as a player who “I look up to and who I compare my mentality to”, and now she will be playing on the same team as Taurasi. After appearing in a handful of games for the Mercury, Williams was traded to the Connecticut Sun on June 26, 2016.

On August 10, 2017, Williams signed with the Perth Lynx for the 2017–18 WNBL season. Williams was named to the WNBL Team of the Week on 14 November 2017, after a 26-point performance against the University of Canberra Capitals. The following week, Williams was named WNBL Player of the Week, after tallying 37 points, 15 rebounds and 13 assists across a pair of victories. Williams was a key contributor in the Perth Lynx's historic 14 game winning streak, resulting in the team finishing the regular season on top of the ladder. Williams finished the WNBL regular season averaging 21.7 PPG, 6.5 RPG, 4.1 APG, 2.25 STPG and 0.9 BLKPG.

On February 19, 2020, Williams was traded to the Atlanta Dream as part of a three-team trade.

In October of 2021, Williams (along with teammate Crystal Bradford) was released from her contract after a video of them circulated through various media outlets of their involvement in a fight outside of an Atlanta area food truck.

The Connecticut Sun re-signed Williams for the 2022 WNBA season.

WNBA career statistics

Regular season 

|-
| style="text-align:left;"| 2016
| style="text-align:left;"| Phoenix
| 6 || 0 || 4.2 || .111 || .000 || .500 || 1.2 || 0.3 || 0.0 || 0.0 || 0.3 || 0.5
|-
| style="text-align:left;"| 2016
| style="text-align:left;"| Connecticut
| 19 || 0 || 17.2 || .427 || .308 || .579 || 3.6 || 1.5 || 0.6 || 0.2 || 1.0 || 8.1
|-
| style="text-align:left;"| 2017
| style="text-align:left;"| Connecticut
| 34 || 28 || 26.0 || .473 || .324 || .878 || 4.2 || 2.1 || 0.5 || 0.2 || 1.4 || 12.3
|-
| style="text-align:left;"| 2018
| style="text-align:left;"| Connecticut
| 30 || 29 || 27.1 || .456 || .377 || .680 || 5.9 || 3.0 || 0.8 || 0.1 || 1.8 || 12.6
|-
| style="text-align:left;"| 2019
| style="text-align:left;"| Connecticut
| 34 || 34 || 29.1 || .435 || .457 || .800 || 5.6 || 3.8 || 1.4 || 0.4 || 1.6 || 13.2
|-
| style="text-align:left;"| 2020
| style="text-align:left;"| Atlanta
| 20 || 14 || 30.8 || .436 || .235 || .696 || 7.2 || 3.2 || 0.7 || 0.1 || 2.7 || 14.6
|-
| style="text-align:left;"| 2021
| style="text-align:left;"| Atlanta
| 32 || 32 || 34.4 || .418 || .382 || .642 || 6.8 || 4.0 || 1.1 || 0.5 || 1.8 || 16.5 
|-
| style="text-align:left;"| 2022
| style="text-align:left;"| Connecticut
| 34 || 34 || 27.9 || .426 || .338 || .750 || 4.6 || 3.3 || 1.0 || 0.4 || 1.7 || 11.1
|-
| style="text-align:left;"| Career
| style="text-align:left;"| 7 years, 3 teams
| 209 || 171 || 27.3 || .437 || .354 || .737 || 5.3 || 3.0 || 0.9 || 0.3 || 1.7 || 12.5

Postseason 

|-
| style="text-align:left;"| 2017
| style="text-align:left;"| Connecticut
| 1 || 1 || 31.0 || .455 || .000 || .000 || 6.0 || 2.0 || 1.0 || 1.0 || 3.0 || 10.0
|-
| style="text-align:left;"| 2018
| style="text-align:left;"| Connecticut
| 1 || 1 || 33.0 || .478 || .800 || .333 || 8.0 || 3.0 || 0.0 || 0.0 || 1.0 || 27.0
|-
| style="text-align:left;"| 2019
| style="text-align:left;"| Connecticut
| 8 || 8 || 34.4 || .428 || .414 || .813 || 5.8 || 4.4 || 0.9 || 0.1 || 1.8 || 17.9
|-
| style="text-align:left;"| 2022
| style="text-align:left;"| Connecticut
| 12 || 12 || 27.1 || .415 || .318 || .667 || 3.9 || 2.3 || 0.6 || 0.5 || 1.4 || 10.3
|-
| style="text-align:left;"| Career
| style="text-align:left;"| 4 years, 1 team
| 22 || 22 || 30.2 || .427 || .404 || .720 || 4.9 || 3.1 || 0.7 || 0.4 || 1.6 || 13.8

Awards and honors 
 2014—AAC First team
 2014–15 added to watchlist for the Wooden Award, Dawn Staley award, the Naismith Trophy, and the Wade Trophy
 2015—AP All-America honorable mention
 2016—AAC First team (unanimous)
 2016—AAC Scholar-Athlete

Personal
Williams is the daughter of Michele and Donald Williams, and has one sister, Doniece.

References

External links

1994 births
Living people
All-American college women's basketball players
American women's basketball players
Atlanta Dream players
Basketball players at the 2015 Pan American Games
Basketball players from Georgia (U.S. state)
Connecticut Sun players
LGBT basketball players
LGBT people from Georgia (U.S. state)
Lesbian sportswomen
Pan American Games medalists in basketball
Pan American Games silver medalists for the United States
People from Charlton County, Georgia
Phoenix Mercury draft picks
Phoenix Mercury players
Point guards
South Florida Bulls women's basketball players
Galatasaray S.K. (women's basketball) players
Medalists at the 2015 Pan American Games
United States women's national basketball team players
Women's National Basketball Association All-Stars